Roman Anatoliyevich Berezovsky (born 5 August 1974) is an Armenian professional football coach and a former goalkeeper.

Berezovsky is the caretaker manager of the Armenia national football team. He previously played for Zenit Saint Petersburg, Khimki and Torpedo Moscow, among other clubs. He also holds a Russian passport.

Early life
Roman Berezovsky was born on 5 August 1974 in Yerevan, Armenian SSR to ethnic Ukrainian parents.

Club career
Roman was voted Russia's best goalkeeper in the late 1990s. His stable performances in the Armenia national team made him a fan favorite. He is also the current record holder for most saves during penalty kicks in the Russian/USSR championships with 14 saves made.

Berezovsky began his professional career in 1991 in the Soviet Top League. The first club of his career was the modest Koshkagorts. In the first Armenian Premier League, the 1992 Armenian Premier League, he started the season in Shengavit Yerevan and ended in Syunik Kapan. After the completion of the season, Berezovsky moved to St. Petersburg, where he played the season with the local Kosmos-Kirovets. After that, for the next season, moved to the Zenit Saint Petersburg. But in that season, he played just five matches.

Zenit Saint Petersburg
Berezovsky, at the lack of match practice in 1995, was loaned to the club Saturn-1991 Saint Petersburg. But due to rent for the season, he played only three matches. After returning to the Zenit, Berezovsky spent the best years of his career there. During the five years spent in Petersburg with the club, he has played in 118 games and in which missed 110 balls. They also managed to win the 1998–99 Russian Cup trophy. Also, the goalkeeper finished third in a list of the 33 best players of the Russian Premier League and won 'Best goalkeeper of the Russian Football Championship' from Russian Sport-Express.

In 1999, Zenit began playing goalkeeper Vyacheslav Malafeev, who graduated from the Zenit local football school. After Berezovsky was sent off for insulting a referee, Malafeev made his debut in the match against the Alania Vladikavkaz.

Torpedo Moscow
Berezovsky spent his last season in Zenit in 2000, from which he went to Torpedo Moscow and then in Dynamo Moscow, where he spent the next four years. With the capital club Torpedo, Berezovsky has not won a trophy, but spent a lot of games (88). On 30 June 2003, he was called to play for the Legionnaires team of the Russian Premier League. The Legion team lost to the Russian team 5–2.

Khimki
Berezovsky moved to Khimki in 2006. With him, they won a ticket to the Russian Premier League and four seasons entrenched in it. During this period, Berezovsky has won four individual trophies: 3rd place among goalies on the number of clean sheets in the Russian championships, 1st place among goalkeepers on the number of goals conceded in the Russian Premier League, and became the Champion of Russia in the Soviet and Russian football as reflected by the number of penalties. Berezovsky became the 26th member of the Lev Yashin club. In a match with Amkar, Khimki won 2–0. This was his one hundredth "dry" game. On 15 April 2008, Berezovsky was elected captain of FC Khimki. On 27 December 2010, Roman signed a new contract with the club. The agreement was for one-year. At 175, Berezovsky has made two second most league appearances for Khimki, after Miodrag Jovanović.

Return to Dynamo Moscow
On 2 February 2012, Berezovsky signed a 1.5-year contract with Dynamo Moscow. It had been 10 years since he signed his first contract with Dynamo. He made his debut in a match against Anzhi Makhachkala, in which he missed only one goal.

He began 2014–2015 Russian Premier League season for Dynamo Moscow as the starting goalkeeper.

At the age of 40, he started in all 4 UEFA Europa League qualifying round matches for Dynamo Moscow, which saw the team successfully enter the group stage of the 2014–15 UEFA Europa League.

International career
Roman has participated in 79 international matches since his debut in home 1998 FIFA World Cup qualification match against Portugal on 31 August 1996. He is considered as the best Armenian goalkeeper ever. Berezovsky holds the record of second most capped player of the Armenia national team, after former captain Sargis Hovsepyan. He was controversially given a red card during a decisive UEFA Euro 2012 qualifying game against Ireland. Spanish referee Eduardo Iturralde González, who resigned after the match, penalized Berezovsky for handball, although replays clearly showed his hands never touched the ball. The FFA filed protest over the bad call, but were denied. Berezovsky's undeserved removal had been the factor that cost Armenia the game. He was named the new captain for the national team on 12 October 2012 and first played as captain for a 2014 FIFA World Cup qualification match against Italy after Hovsepyan had previously retired.

Coaching career
On 19 June 2019, he left FC Dynamo Moscow after 11 years spent at the club and joined PFC Sochi as a goalkeepers coach under the manager (and former teammate) Aleksandr Tochilin in Sochi's first ever Russian Premier League season. On 20 November 2019, Tochilin was dismissed for poor results and Berezovsky was appointed caretaker manager. The new permanent manager Vladimir Fedotov was appointed by Sochi on 8 December.

Pyunik
On 8 January 2020, Berezovsky was announced as the new manager of Armenian Premier League club FC Pyunik. Just over 7-months later, 13 July 2020, Berezovsky left the club by mutual consent.

Career statistics

Honours
Zenit Saint Petersburg
Russian Cup: 1998–99
Khimki
Russian First Division: 2006

References

External links

news.sportbox.ru  

armfootball.tripod.com

1974 births
Living people
Footballers from Yerevan
Armenian footballers
Armenia international footballers
Armenian expatriate footballers
Association football goalkeepers
FC Zenit Saint Petersburg players
FC Torpedo Moscow players
FC Dynamo Moscow players
FC Khimki players
Expatriate footballers in Russia
Russian Premier League players
Armenian people of Ukrainian descent
Soviet footballers
Russian footballers
Armenian football managers
Russian Premier League managers
PFC Sochi managers
FC Pyunik managers